William Albert Sharpley DCM (December 1890 – 1 July 1916) was an English professional footballer who played as a left back in the Football League for Leicester Fosse.

Personal life 
Prior to 1912, Sharpley enlisted in the Essex Regiment of the British Army. After the outbreak of the First World War, his battalion arrived on the Western Front on 21 August 1914 and saw action at Le Cateau, Marne, Messines and Armentières. Serving as a sergeant, he was mentioned in dispatches and won the Cross of St. George 2nd Class "for conspicuous gallantry in rescuing and bringing in across the open and under fire, a wounded NCO" in late 1914. In February 1916, Sharpley won the Distinguished Conduct Medal for bringing another wounded man in under fire, southeast of Hébuterne. As a result of his death, Sharpley's sister Kate became an anarchist campaigner.

Career statistics

References

1890 births
Footballers from Bow, London
English footballers
Association football fullbacks
English Football League players
British Army personnel of World War I
1916 deaths
Military personnel from London
Essex Regiment soldiers
British military personnel killed in the Battle of the Somme
Leicester City F.C. players
Recipients of the Distinguished Conduct Medal
Recipients of the Cross of St. George